The Jilin Ring Expressway, designated as G1201 is an expressway in Northw Northwestern Chinese province of Jilin going around the city of Jilin.  This expressway is a branch of G12 Hunwu Expressway.

Detailed Itinerary

References

Expressways in Jilin